Lawrence Abraham Buhler (May 28, 1917 – August 21, 1990) was a fullback/halfback  in the National Football League who played 21 games for the Green Bay Packers.  He played for the University of Minnesota Golden Gophers under Bernie Bierman.   In 1939, the Green Bay Packers used the 9th pick in the 1st round of the 1939 NFL Draft to sign Buhler out of the University of Minnesota. Buhler played for three seasons with the Packers and retired in 1941.  Buhler ended his working career as the manager of the municipal liquor store in Windom, Minnesota.  He worked as assistant manager and manager for 16 years and 8 months before retiring at the end of 1983.  A statue of Buhler was erected on the grounds of the Cottonwood County Courthouse and was dedicated in 1993.

References

External links
Packers.com
NFL.com

1917 births
1990 deaths
People from Windom, Minnesota
American football fullbacks
American football halfbacks
Green Bay Packers players
Minnesota Golden Gophers football players
Players of American football from Minnesota